Message passing is a mechanism for inter-process communication.

Message passing may also refer to:

 Belief propagation, or sum–product message passing, a message-passing algorithm for performing inference on graphical models
 Variational message passing
 Message passing in computer clusters